Sally McDonald is an American television soap opera director. Beside working on daytime, McDonald was also a production supervisor for game shows The $10,000 Pyramid, Card Sharks and Win, Lose or Draw. Her son is also famous on an called "TikTok" with over 4,000 TikTok followers on his account HickoryFTBL

Positions held
The Young and the Restless
 Production Supervisor (1990 - 1993)
 Associate Director (1993 – 1997)
 Director (1997– 2011) ( October 2012- present)
 Producer (2008)
 Supervising Producer (May 2011 – present)

Awards and nominations
Daytime Emmy Award
Nomination, 1994, 1995, 2000, 2004–2006, Directing Team, The Young and the Restless
Win, 1996–1999, 2001, 2002, Directing Team, The Young and the Restless

Directors Guild of America Award
Nomination, 2003, Directing Team, The Young and the Restless (episode #7784)
Nomination, 1998, Directing Team, The Young and the Restless (episode #6437)

References

External links

American television directors
American women television directors
Living people
Place of birth missing (living people)
Year of birth missing (living people)
American soap opera directors